Black Skin, White Masks is a 1952 book by philosopher-psychiatrist Frantz Fanon. The book is written in the style of autoethnography, with Fanon sharing his own experiences while presenting a historical critique of the effects of racism and dehumanization, inherent in situations of colonial domination, on the human psyche.

The violent overtones in Fanon can be broken down into two categories: The violence of the colonizer through annihilation of body, psyche, culture, along with the demarcation of space. And secondly the violence of the colonized as an attempt to retrieve dignity, sense of self, and history through anti-colonial struggle.

Summary 
Black Skin, White Masks applies a historical critique on the complex ways in which identity, particularly Blackness, is constructed and produced. Fanon confronts complex formations of colonized psychic constructions of Blackness in the book. He applies psychoanalysis to explain the feelings of dependency and inadequacy that black people experience. Fanon paints the perception of white people as having a deep-seated fear of educated blacks. He explains, no matter how assimilated a black person may become, whites will always exercise a sense of 'inferiority.' This way of thinking was designed to keep 'Blacks' stuck in a "inferior status within a colonial order." The divided self-perception of a Black Subject who has lost his native cultural origin, and embraced the culture of the Mother Country, produces an inferior sense of self in the "Black Man." They will try to appropriate and imitate the culture of the colonizer where such behavior is more readily evident in upwardly mobile and educated Black people who can afford to acquire status symbols within the world of the colonial ecumene, such as an education abroad and mastery of the language of the colonizer, the white masks.

Based upon, and derived from, the concepts of the collective unconscious and collective catharsis, the sixth chapter, "The Negro and Psychopathology", presents brief, deep psychoanalyses of colonized black people, and thus proposes the inability of black people to fit into the norms (social, cultural, racial) established by white society (the colonizer). That "a normal Negro child, having grown up in a normal Negro family, will become abnormal on the slightest contact of the white world." That, in a white society, such an extreme psychological response originates from the unconscious and unnatural training of black people, from early childhood, to associate "blackness" with "wrongness". That such unconscious mental training of black children is effected with comic books and cartoons, which are cultural media that instil and affix, in the mind of the white child, the society's cultural representations of black people as villains. Moreover, when black children are exposed to such images of villainous black people, the children will experience a psychopathology (psychological trauma), which mental wound becomes inherent to their individual, behavioral make-up; a part of his and her personality. That the early-life suffering of said psychopathology – black skin associated with villainy – creates a collective nature among the men and women who were reduced to colonized populations. In Black Skin, White Masks, Fanon speaks about Mayotte Capécia and Abdoulaye Sadji who are two writers that wrote books during that era. Fanon describes I Am a Martinican Woman and Nini, mulâtresse du Sénégal as examples of some of the cultural damage of colonization. Capécia, a black woman, wants to marry a white man despite the social and cultural boundaries in place. Fanon believes Capécia is desperate for white approval. The colonial culture has left an impression on black Martinican women to believe that "whiteness is virtue and beauty" and that they can in turn "save their race by making themselves whiter."

In the subsection to chapter seven, The Black Man and Hegel, Fanon examines the dialectics of the philosopher and conveys his suspicions of the black man being under the rubric of a philosophy modeled after whiteness. According to Fanon there is a conflict that takes form internally as self-deprecation because of this white philosophical affirmation.

Reception
First published in French in Martinique, Black Skin, White Masks (1952) did not attract much mainstream attention in English-speaking countries. It explored the effects of colonialism and imposing a servile psychology upon the colonized man, woman, and child. The adverse effects were assessed as part of the post-colonial cultural legacy of the Mother Country to former imperial subjects.

Together with Fanon's The Wretched of the Earth, it received wider attention during cultural upheavals starting in the 1960s, in the United States as well as former colonial countries in the Caribbean and Africa. It is considered an important anti-colonial, anti-racist, and Afro-pessimist work in Anglophone countries. But in Francophone countries, the book is ranked as a relatively minor Fanon work in comparison to his later, more radical works. The topic is explicitly connected culturally to the societies of the ethnic African and other peoples of color living within the French Colonial Empire (1534–1980).

The psychological and psychiatric insights remain valid, especially as applied by peoples of diverse colonial and imperial histories, such as the Palestinians and Kurds in the Middle East, the Tamils in Sri Lanka, the African Americans in the US, and Puerto Ricans, in their contemporary struggles for cultural and political autonomy. Contemporary theorists of nationalism and of anti-colonialism, of liberation theology and of cultural studies, have preferred Frantz Fanon's later culturally and politically revolutionary works, such as The Wretched of the Earth (1962). Nevertheless, Black Skin, White Masks continues to generate debate. In 2015, leading African studies scholar Lewis R. Gordon published a book titled What Fanon Said: A Philosophical Introduction To His Life And Thought.

Anthony Elliott writes that Black Skin, White Masks is a "seminal" work.

Freedom and Blackness 

Freedom and Blackness according to Sidney Mintz, is not a culture deliberately set upon breaking “cultural rules and norms”; instead, its focus is to be free. Free to express themselves in a way that is authentic to the Caribbean culture, and free to be able to live free from those who were once called master. A culture separate from that of their European colonizers yet still be recognized on an equal level. This movement of freedom and blackness requires knowledge on multiple interdisciplinary studies, such as politics for emancipation, racial inequalities and post-emancipation, all within the context of a post-colonial world. Colonization, instead of helping countries, has destroyed culture all over the world. Colonization has enforced the thought process of "white supremacy" and has suppressed/eradicated cultures all over the Caribbean. An example of this, according to Fanon, is the Malagasy culture. He explains that the Malagasy culture has been colonized so much that if they were to be liberated, they would be left with nothing. Fanon regulates imagination of Blackness by his willingness to merely "envisage" through a rubric of epidermalization, which is yet another form of enclosure.

Phobogenesis
Phobogenesis is a term derived from psychiatry and psychoanalysis, and is specifically obtained from the concept of the phobic object. This is a thing or person that elicits “irrational feelings of dread, fear, and hate” in a subject, and whose threat is often exaggerated. In the context of race, Fanon postulates that the black person is a phobogenic object, sparking anxiety in the eyes of white subjects. Fanon's definition of phobia is based on that of French psychologist Angelo Hesnard, who defined phobia as a “neurosis characterized by the anxious fear of an object (in the broadest sense of anything outside the individual) or, by extension, of a situation”. Thus, black people as a phobogenic object elicit insecurity in white people. 

Fanon follows Hesnard's definition to assert that this insecurity causes both fear and hatred of the phobogenic object at the same time. Therefore, in Fanon's theory, the white subject finds the black person both revolting and threatening simultaneously. The reaction induced by the phobogenic object is extremely irrational and exaggerated, as is the danger posed by it. The object is attributed “evil intentions and … a malefic power”, giving excessive weight to its threat to the white subject. This reaction prioritizes emotion and affect in a manner that “defies all rational thinking”, Fanon's words, highlighting that the psychiatric aspect of racial hatred is not clearly or rationally explicable.

See also

 Afro-pessimism
 Cultural studies
 Inversion in post-colonial theory
 Pan-Africanism
 Post-colonial literature
 Post-colonialism
 The Colonizer and the Colonized (1965), by Albert Memmi
 The Wretched of the Earth (1961), by Frantz Fanon
Culture of Martinique

References

1952 non-fiction books
Books by Frantz Fanon
Éditions du Seuil books
French non-fiction books
Sociology books